Lethe (Λήθη) is a goddess and the river of forgetfulness in Greek mythology'.

Lethe may also refer to:
 River Lethe, a river in Alaska
 Lethe (genus), a butterfly genus in the family Nymphalidae
 Lethe (Hunte), a river of lower Saxony, Germany, tributary of the Hunte
 Lethe (video game), an adventure/survival horror video game released in 2016
 Lethe Press, an American publishing company
 Sailor Lethe, a minor character in the Sailor Moon metaseries
 A song from the album The Gallery by the melodic death metal band Dark Tranquillity
 "Lethe" (Person of Interest), an episode of the TV series Person of Interest
 "Lethe" (Star Trek: Discovery), an episode of the science fiction television series